Secession in China refers to several secessionist movements in the People's Republic of China. Many current separatist movements in China arise from the country's ethnic issues. Some of the factors that have created these ethnic issues include history, nationalism, economic and political disparity, religion, and other factors. China has historically had tensions between the majority Han and other minority ethnic groups, particularly in rural and border regions. Historically other ruling ethnicities, such as the Manchu of the early-Qing dynasty, experienced ethnic issues as well.

Legal basis

Republic of China
Kuomintang leader Sun Yat-sen issued a statement calling for the right of self-determination of all Chinese ethnic groups at a party conference in 1924:

“The Kuomintang can state with solemnity that it recognizes the right of self-determination of all national minorities in China and it will organize a free and united Chinese republic.”

People’s Republic of China
The 1931 constitution of the Chinese Soviet Republic accepted secession as legal with article 14 stating “The Soviet government of China recognizes the right of self-determination of the national minorities in China, their right to complete separation from China, and to the formation of an independent state for each national minority.” However, the CCP's change from a revolutionary group to the dominant state power in 1949 led to this language being left out of later constitutions and any legal chance for secession disappeared from Chinese law.

List of secessionist movements in the People's Republic of China

Minor movements 
  Bashu nationalism or Basuria independence movement
  Shanghainese nationalism, Shanghai independence movement or Nguyuit Republic independence movement
  Inner Mongolian independence movement, also known as the South Mongolian independence movement
 Macau independence movement

Historical 
Xiang nationalism or Hunan independence movement
Liangguang Republic, 1900
The term "Liangguang" refers to a combination of the provinces of Guangdong and Guangxi. It was an historical administrative division of China during the Qing dynasty era. The island province of Hainan also used to be part of Guangdong and, by extension, Liangguang.

Movements

Hong Kong 
In 1997 the colony of Hong Kong was retroceded to China, leading to the creation of the Hong Kong Special Administrative Region. Under the jointly agreed upon Hong Kong Basic Law, the Hong Kong SAR would maintain its autonomy for 50 years until 2047, after which point the region would assume full control by China. Hong Kong's autonomy, and its end in 2047, has created contention between those who support the Chinese government, and those who do not. A particular source of contention in recent years is with the structure of the Hong Kong government, where the Chief Executive is appointed by the Chinese government while local elections are held directly.

In 2019 the Hong Kong extradition bill was proposed, which sparked protests throughout Hong Kong. During the protests which followed, the pro-democracy camp gained general support alongside the Hong Kong independence movement to a small extent as well. Many of the anti-governmental groups supported localism and universal suffrage in all Hong Kong elections. In May 2020 the National People's Congress of China passed a decision concerning Hong Kong national security legislation, whereby "secession" and "subversion" were made illegal. This move has meant that pro-independence calls are now illegal by the new decision, although some still do call for independence despite the changes to the law. In Hong Kong, the pro-democracy camp enjoys general support, though the passing of the decision by the NPC has made protesting and the organization of protests more difficult.

Macau
The Macau independence movement is the political movement that advocates for the independence of Macau from China. Despite receiving little attention within Macau, the issue was raised in the Legislative Assembly of Macau following the Hong Kong Legislative Council oath-taking controversy. In 2017, several Chinese media outlets warned against discussion of Macau independence, fearing that speculation would lead to further action.
The Swedish magazine The Perspective speculated that the relative lack of independence sentiment in Macau stems from the SAR's reliance on gaming and tourism revenue from the Mainland. Macau is currently one of the richest regions in the world, and its wealth is derived almost entirely from gambling, which is illegal in the PRC.

Tibet 

After the failed Tibetan uprising, some Tibetans followed the Dalai Lama into India, establishing a government-in-exile called the Central Tibetan Administration.

The movement is no longer supported by the 14th Dalai Lama, who although having advocated it from 1961 to the late 1970s, proposed a sort of high-level autonomy in a speech in Strasbourg in 1988, and has since then restricted his position to either autonomy for the Tibetan people in the Tibet Autonomous Region within China, or extending the area of the autonomy to include parts of neighboring Chinese provinces inhabited by Tibetans.

Xinjiang 

Several armed insurgency groups are fighting the Chinese (PRC) government in Xinjiang, namely the Turkestan Islamic Party and the East Turkestan Liberation Organization, which some people consider to be associated with Al-Qaeda and the Islamic State.

Inner Mongolia 

South Mongolian independence is supported by these political parties: the Inner Mongolian People's Party, a member of the Unrepresented Nations and Peoples Organization; the Southern Mongolian Democratic Alliance; and the Mongolian Liberal Union Party.

Manchukuo
The Manchukuo Government (formerly known as the Manchukuo Temporary Government until 2019) is an organisation established in 2004 in Hong Kong. On its website, it claims to be the government in exile of Manchukuo, a Japanese puppet state with limited recognition which controlled Manchuria from 1932 to 1945; it seeks to revive the state and to separate it from the People's Republic of China, which controls its claimed territory. On its website, it claims to have merged with other Manchu independence organizations as of 2019.

See also

 Cantonese nationalism
 Language Atlas of China
 China proper
 List of active separatist movements in Asia

References

National liberation movements
Politics of China
Separatism in China
Secession